Um Hyo-sup (born October 24, 1966) is a South Korean actor. Um mostly plays supporting roles in films and television dramas.

Filmography

Film

Television series

Web series

References

External links 
 Um Hyo-sup Fan Cafe at Daum 
 Um Hyo-sup at Star Village Entertainment 
 
 
 

1966 births
Living people
South Korean male television actors
South Korean male film actors
South Korean male stage actors
Yeongwol Eom clan